Elections to the Moray Council were held on 6 May 1999, the same day as the other Scottish local government elections and the Scottish Parliament general election.

Election results

Ward results

References

1999
1999 Scottish local elections
20th century in Moray